Robert Douglas Whistle (born April 30, 1961) is a Canadian former professional ice hockey defenceman who played for the New York Rangers and St. Louis Blues of the National Hockey League (NHL).

Playing career
Whistle was signed as a free agent by the New York Rangers on August 13, 1985. He played 32 games for the Rangers before getting traded to St. Louis for Tony McKegney and Bruce Bell. After playing 19 games for the Blues, he was traded to the Washington Capitals. However, he played for their farm club the whole season, and he retired at the end of that season.

Career statistics

See also
List of New York Rangers players
List of St. Louis Blues players

External links

1961 births
Baltimore Skipjacks players
Canadian ice hockey defencemen
Ice hockey people from Ontario
Sportspeople from Thunder Bay
Kitchener Rangers players
Living people
New Haven Nighthawks players
New York Rangers players
Peoria Rivermen (AHL) players
St. Louis Blues players
Undrafted National Hockey League players